The Theresienstadt Papers (in German original Theresienstadt-Konvolut) are a collection of historical documents of the Jewish self-government of Theresienstadt concentration camp. These papers include an "A list" of so-called "prominents" interned in the camp and a "B-list" created by the Jewish Elders themselves. The Theresienstadt papers include two albums with biographies and many photographs, 64 watercolors and drawings from prisoners in Theresiendstadt, and the annual report of the Theresienstadt Central Library. The papers were preserved at the liberation of the camp in May 1945 by Theresienstadt librarian Käthe Starke-Goldschmidt and later loaned to the Altona Museum for Art and Cultural History in Hamburg by her son Pit Goldschmidt. The collection was opened for viewing by the public in 2002 at the Heine Haus branch of the Altona Museum.

The prominents of Theresienstadt
Theresienstadt, also called Terezin, was a hybrid of ghetto and concentration camp. Although in practice the ghetto, run by the SS, served as a transit camp for Jews en route to extermination camps, it was also presented as a "model Jewish settlement" for propaganda purposes.

From 1942, the Nazis interned the Jews of Bohemia and Moravia, elderly Jews and persons of "special merit" in the Reich, and several thousand Jews from the Netherlands and Denmark. The camp became known as the destination for the Altentransporte ("elderly transports") of German Jews, older than 65. Many prominent artists from Czechoslovakia, Austria, and Germany were imprisoned at Theresienstadt, along with writers, scientists, jurists, diplomats, musicians, and scholars.

Among the western European Jews deported to the camp were 456 Jews from Denmark, sent to Theresienstadt in 1943, and a number of European Jewish children whom Danish organizations had tried to conceal in foster homes. The arrival of the Danes was significant, as their government requested access to the camp for the International Red Cross, so that they could view and evaluate conditions there. Historians believe the Nazis complied with the request to keep the Danes satisfied, as they were impressed by the production of Danish workers in factories. In addition, the tide of war was changing.

As part of the general preparations for the Red Cross visit, in the spring of 1944, the Gestapo screened the Jews of Theresienstadt, classifying them according to social prominence. The prominents of Theresienstadt were catalogued in two almost identical portfolios in blue cardboard cover and fasteners. Begun on 1 January 1944, these binders include not only resumes and many photographs, but identified the individual according to which category of prominence they fit, "A" or "B". The so-called prominents included cultural professionals, high-ranking military officers, politicians, scientists, aristocrats, bankers and industrialists and also, in some cases, their families.

Those with prominent status drew generally favorable treatment from the camp commandant, including homes with better living conditions, greater food rations, no obligation to work, and, for the "prominent category A", first transport protection. For the Red Cross visit, some 150 to 200 prominent individuals were assigned to single rooms that would be shared by only two people, so that a husband and wife could live by themselves. Several members of the Cultural Council – the "Jewish self-government of Theresienstadt" selected on demand of the Nazis – were included on the prominent list, due to the influence of Benjamin Murmelstein, then an Elder of Theresienstadt. Former prisoners suggested in statements that those who held positions of authority practiced nepotism, trying to protect individuals close to them, while struggling to avoid deportation and death in the closing days of the war.

Watercolors and drawings 

The 64 watercolors and drawings from the Theresienstadt camp were rescued by chief librarian Hugo Friedmann who had been gathering them secretly with the knowledge of library director Emil Utitz. He passed these works to Starke-Goldschmidt in September 1944, just before his deportation through Auschwitz to Dachau. The collection includes only a small part of the drawings and watercolors produced by artists within Theresienstadt to document daily life. (Many visual artists in Theresienstadt were employed in the design office of its Technical Department.) According to Starke-Goldschmidt, the artists lacked drawing paper, so she provided them with blank pages from the volumes within the library itself. The collection includes a self-portrait by Julie Wofthorn as well as images by Felix Bloch, Bedřich (Friedrich) Fritta, Leo Haas, Peter Kien and Otto Ungar. Some of these artists were eventually deported, with their families, to Auschwitz because the camp commandant became aware that they were smuggling images of "atrocity propaganda," as the Nazis termed it, to Switzerland.

The Central Library
The Theresienstadt Central Library was one of several libraries in the combined ghetto and camp. The Central Library had been opened on the order of the camp commandant in November 1942 and remained active until the camp was dissolved, although the bulk of library staff was deported to Auschwitz in autumn of 1944 after the library had been beautified and shown to the Red Cross. During its years in operation, the library grew from a collection of 4,000 volumes to, at the end of the war, 180,000. Books included Hebraica, Judaica, fiction and classics alongside volumes of philosophy, history, and linguistic and scientific literature. The books had been confiscated from private individuals as well as from libraries, with 75% originating in Czechoslovakia and the rest coming from the German Reich. After the war, the holdings of the library were largely transferred to the Jewish Museum in Prague and, secondarily, to the Jerusalem National Library.

List of prominents in the Theresienstadt Papers

Prominents of List A who are not included in the Theresienstadt Papers

Literature 
 Elsa Bernstein: Das Leben als Drama. Erinnerungen an Theresienstadt, Edition Ebersbach, Dortmund 1999 (Hrsg. Rita Bake Birgit Kiupel), .
 Axel Feuß: Das Theresienstadt-Konvolut. Altonaer Museum in Hamburg, Dölling und Galitz Verlag, Hamburg/München 2002, .
 Ralph Oppenhejm: An der Grenze des Lebens – ein Theresienstädter Tagebuch. Kopenhagen 1945, Hamburg 1961.
 Käthe Starke: Der Führer schenkt den Juden eine Stadt. Haude & Spenersche Verlagsbuchhandlung, Berlin 1975, .
 Ruth Bondy: Prominent auf Widerruf, in: Miroslav Karny, Raimund Kemper, Margita Karna (Hrsg.): Theresienstädter Studien und Dokumente, Prag 1995, S. 136–154.

Notes

External links 

 Yad Vashem: Zentrale Datenbank der Holocaust-Opfer
 ghetto-theresienstadt.de: Prominente

Theresienstadt Ghetto
Litoměřice District
Jewish Czech history
Jewish Austrian history
Jewish Danish history
Jewish Dutch history
Jewish German history
Holocaust historical documents
1940s documents